Captain Comet (Adam Blake) is a superhero appearing in American Comic Books published by DC Comics, created by editor Julius Schwartz, writer John Broome, and artist Carmine Infantino.

Once a minor character in the DC Comics canon, he occupies a unique position in DC Comics history as being created between the Golden Age and Silver Age. His early stories fall into a no-man's land, sometimes referred to as "The Atomic Age" because of the recurrent science-fiction themes of most comics of the period, when very few superheroes comics were published and fewer than 12 short-lived superhero characters were introduced.

Along with Marvel Comics' Namor the Sub-Mariner and Toro (sidekick of the original Human Torch), he is among the first mutant metahuman superheroes (meaning he was born with his powers).

Adam Blake appeared in live-action The CW's TV series Naomi, portrayed by Chase Anderson.

Publication history
The character of Captain Comet first appeared in a 10-page tale, "The Origin of Captain Comet", in the flagship science-fiction title Strange Adventures #9 (June 1951) published by National Comics (now known as DC Comics). He was created by Strange Adventures editor Julius Schwartz, John Broome, and artist Carmine Infantino, and the story was written by John Broome (under the alias Edgar Ray Merritt), drawn by Carmine Infantino, and inked by Bernard Sachs. The character was based on the pulp fiction character Captain Future. 

His first appearance was actually a two-part story, continued in "The Air Bandits from Space" in Strange Adventures #10 (July 1951). From issue #12 (September 1951) Murphy Anderson took over as artist, and he drew all Captain Comet's further appearances in Strange Adventures until #46 (July 1954); Sy Barry and Gil Kane drew the last two stories. John Broome wrote every issue.

Captain Comet appeared in 38 issues of Strange Adventures (missing only issues #45, 47, and 48) and ending in Strange Adventures #49 (October 1954). From the beginning, Captain Comet appeared on most of the covers, mainly drawn by Murphy Anderson or Gil Kane. Stories ranged in length from six to 10 pages, dropping from 10 pages in 1951 to eight pages in 1952 and finally six pages from May 1953. He next appeared in 1976, when writer Gerry Conway and co-writer David Anthony Kraft reintroduced him as a supporting character in Secret Society of Super Villains, starting with "No Man Shall Call Me Master" (Secret Society of Super Villains #2 (July/August 1976)). He appeared in most issues of that title, together with the associated Secret Society of Super Villains Special #1 (October 1977), until it was cancelled with issue #15 (June/July 1978). During this run, he also appeared in Super-Team Family Giant #13 (September 1977), a story directly linked to the Secret Society of Super Villains series, and as lead character for the first time since 1954 in an extended story, "Danger: Dinosaurs at Large!" in DC Special #27, April/May 1977, by Bob Rozakis and artist Rich Buckler. Secret Society of Super Villains was cancelled as part of the DC Implosion. Captain Comet was a popular character at the time—he came second in a poll for potential Justice League membership, and writer Bob Rozakis presented DC Comics with a proposal for Captain Comet's first self-titled series.

After the cancellation of Secret Society of Super Villains, Captain Comet entered another hiatus, his appearances limited to guest spots in other DC titles during the 1980s. Four of these were cameo appearances—Crisis on Infinite Earths #5 (August 1985), #10 (January 1986) and #12 (March 1986), and All-Star Squadron #53 (January 1986). Two were team-ups with Superman—DC Comics Presents #22 (June 1980) and 91 (March 1986); the fourth was a retelling of his origin by Roy Thomas in Secret Origins vol. 2 Annual #1 (1987). He also appeared in the non-canonical series DC Challenge (1986).

He then became a supporting character in the L.E.G.I.O.N. series from issue #16 (June 1990). Captain Comet was actually a late replacement for fellow 1950s space traveler Adam Strange who was due to become a regular character, as otherwise it would have clashed with the Adam Strange limited series published around the same time. He was then part of the R.E.B.E.L.S. series which continued from L.E.G.I.O.N. That series was cancelled with R.E.B.E.L.S. ’96 #17 (March 1996), and he had a solo story in Showcase ’96 #10 (November 1996), after which another hiatus followed.

In 2005, under the writer Jim Starlin, Captain Comet had his highest profile in DC Comics publications since the 1950s, featuring in the Rann–Thanagar War miniseries (2005), starring in the eight-issue miniseries Mystery in Space vol. 2 (2006), and co-starring in Rann-Thanagar Holy War (2008) and Strange Adventures vol. 3 (2009), as well as appearing briefly in the 52 (2006) and Final Crisis (2008) events. Following that, he became a regular character in the ongoing R.E.B.E.L.S. series (2009).

In 2011, a revamped version of Captain Comet, renamed simply "Comet", featured in Grant Morrison's run on Action Comics.

Fictional character biography

1950s – Strange Adventures
Captain Comet, the "first man of the future", is a mutant metahuman "born a hundred thousand years before his time", in 1931 to John and Martha Blake, a farming couple from the American Midwest. His "metagene" was triggered by a comet passing overhead at birth.

Adam Blake discovered his unique abilities as he grew up—at the age of four he instantly found a ring his mother had lost ("I just knew it was there"), and by eight years old demonstrated photographic memory by rapidly reading a whole encyclopedia and retaining the information. Other skills manifested almost instantly: he could play musical instruments without training and was secretly expert at sports to Olympic record level. In high school he saved a schoolmate from falling to her death by mental force, but despite his powers he felt isolated from other humans because of his differences from them. After leaving school he became a librarian in Midwest City, where he sought the help of a renowned physicist, Professor Emery Zackro, who tested him and discovered Adam was a mutant—postulating he was the reverse of an evolutionary throwback, "an accidental specimen of future man". His Captain Comet persona began when Adam used his powers to intervene when criminals attempted to steal an advanced scientific device invented by Professor Zackro. Immediately after this, Blake and the Professor agreed Blake should become a superhero on a full-time basis, and he made his first appearance in public as Captain Comet combating giant, terraforming robot tops belonging to an alien race looking for a world to colonize. During this task, Adam built a working version of a prototype spaceship Professor Zackro had designed, which would become his personal spaceship, The Cometeer, and took up a costume, spacesuit and stun gun also invented by the Professor.

Over the next three years, he saved Earth from multiple alien invasions and explored space in The Cometeer, saving other civilizations and meeting beautiful alien damsels in distress. During this period, he largely used intelligence and his mind-reading skills to help solve problems, seldom resorting to physical solutions. Among his weirder adventures, Captain Comet battled mad Greek gods from space, fought dinosaurs and alien creatures, and came up against an evil super-powered ape several times. Sometime after 1954 he disappeared into space in The Cometeer on another expedition of discovery, but this time he would not return for over 20 years.

1970s–1980s
In 1976 Captain Comet returned to Earth, having not aged, with a new protective costume instead of a spacesuit, and enhanced skills—controlling his appearance mentally (although dressing in 1950s style)—and with a powerful physical punch as well as a mental force, super-speed, and an ability to manipulate objects. He also had an explanation for his absence—having always felt alienated from normal humans because of his abilities, he has been over 20 years in space. After misreading a battle between Green Lantern and Gorilla Grodd, and some trickery by Grodd, he ended up joining the Secret Society of Super Villains and battled Darkseid and the forces of Apokolips with them. Later he turned down full membership in the Justice League, but became an honorary member and took up residence in their satellite headquarters. After fighting Chronos and dinosaurs in Gotham City, the Captain continued his crusade against the Secret Society of Super Villains despite a number of setbacks orchestrated by Gorilla Grodd.

Although present at the marriage of Ray Palmer and Jean Loring several months later, Captain Comet remained off-radar for nearly two years, eventually contacting Superman when the effect of the comet that mutated him wore off, turning him into a human comet whose powers fluctuated wildly. With Superman's help he tracked down the comet and stabilized his powers. Superman's help was needed again six years later when the villain Brain Storm attempted to augment his waning powers by stealing Captain Comet's power, which accidentally evolved him to a more advanced form temporarily.

1990s – L.E.G.I.O.N. / R.E.B.E.L.S.
He spent the next few years "roaming the stars... just drifting", before being captured by the space outlaw Dagon-Ra despite his new powers including near invulnerability, telekinesis and increased strength. Rescued by L.E.G.I.O.N., he recuperated in their headquarters hospital and was invited to join them soon after, and did so a year later.

His involvement with L.E.G.I.O.N. was in a supporting role. He fell in love with fellow member scientist Marij'n Bek, who nursed him back to health and studied the massive headaches he frequently suffered. These were the result of his possession by a psi-creature in space before meeting L.E.G.I.O.N.; it was eventually purged by Vril Dox, leaving the Captain once again hospitalised for months. Soon after he was apparently killed by Lady Quark—who had been possessed by the same parasite. Buried under a mountain on Ith'kaa, he eventually dug himself out and used his knowledge to manipulate the savage indigenous population to achieve the technological level to build him a spaceship (explaining later, without irony, that it took six months to industrialize the tribal society because "they were slow learners"). Returning to R.E.B.E.L.S. homeworld of Cairn, he learned that Vril Dox's son Lyrl had brainwashed most of the L.E.G.I.O.N., made the key L.E.G.I.O.N. members fugitives, and taken control of Cairn; he and Maryj'n formed a resistance movement to free the population and overthrow Lyrl, and were key in successfully defeating him. As a result, Captain Comet became leader of the new, reformed L.E.G.I.O.N.

During this period, Captain Comet took up residence (with Tyrone, an artificially created telepathic clone bulldog) in The Zelazny Building on "Hardcore Station", a corrupt commercial satellite station with a population of several million in a free space zone between a number of trading civilisations.

Post 1990s

Rann–Thanagar War
At some undefined point in the next 10 years Captain Comet stepped down as leader and became a paid freelance aide and agent to Vril Dox, who took back the L.E.G.I.O.N. reins. He was next seen with Dox under contract to the planet Ancar, which had been invaded by Khunds during the Rann–Thanagar War; after intervention by Green Lantern Kyle Rayner, he decided to stay and help him end the war. He first accompanied Kyle to the destroyed planet Thanagar, where they built a protective dome and terraformed the land to create a secure environment for the survivors. Then he joined up with Adam Strange and Hawkman to defend Rann against the Thanagarians under the control of the demon Onimar Synn, who he was instrumental in destroying.

52 and Mystery in Space
A year after the events of Infinite Crisis, Captain Comet was captured and tortured by Lady Styx, forcing him to jettison his primary consciousness from his body before death. His psychic self merged briefly with that of The Weird, which had been drifting in space since his death, and both were revived in new bodies. Captain Comet's new body re-formed at Hardcore Station—with golden eyes, a 20-year-old's physique, and the ability to teleport, although he had lost some strength. Shortening his name to Comet and fostering the misconception that he was his own nephew, he searched for the remains of his old body on Hardcore Station, discovering that it had been stolen by the Eternal Light Corporation Church and he was being hunted by a team of their telepathic assassins. On breaking into the Eternal Light Corporation's building, he uncovered that brainwashed cloned telepaths were being grown from the charred remains of his corpse, which he destroyed. Becoming a fugitive, he hid from the E.L.C. so they could not use his new body to continue their cloning—allowing thousands of Hardcore residents to die when the E.L.C. cut off life support to a whole area of Hardcore Station to force them to surrender Comet. Eventually he destroyed all the clones and the E.L.C., also killing hundreds of their followers.

Rann–Thanagar Holy War, Strange Adventures (vol 3) and R.E.B.E.L.S.
Target of an assassination attempt by a surviving E.L.C. follower during a resurgence of the faith, Comet accepted an offer by Adam Strange to leave Hardcore Station and help quell growing religious fanaticism on Rann. He ended up working with Adam Strange, Hawkman, Starfire, The Weird, and the Prince Gavyn Starman against the influences of the warring Lord Synnar (a cosmic tyrant behind the Eternal Light Corporation) and Lady Styx on Rann and Thanagar (which once again set the two planets on course for war). Their interference was eventually key in Lord Synnar's plans to reach a higher plane of existence.

Later, Comet learned from the future spirit of Synnar that he is destined to be one of "The Aberrant Six": a group critical to preventing Synnar (trapped in The Weird's body) from destroying the universe. Ultimately the Aberrant Six did not form, and the future Synnar was forced to leave after Comet's mercenary friend Eye was killed by Synnar's supreme god-enemy. Comet was entrusted with Eye's robot companion, Orb, until Synnar returns to "continue his negotiations". Comet then returned to Hardcore Station, and almost immediately joined Vril Dox's new R.E.B.E.L.S. He entered into a brief relationship with Starfire and helped defeat Starro, saving Rann, the Vega System and the galaxy.

The New 52
Adam Blake was re-introduced in the 2011 New 52 event during Grant Morrison and Rags Morales revamp of Action Comics. In this reality, Adam Blake was "Comet", a hyper-evolved human, who at the time of his birth, a comet passed over his house. The comet's radiation caused his body to evolve, and be, as scientist Emery Zackro called it, "born 1000 years ahead of his time".

Misunderstood, he was shunned by his father and the rest of the town, and roamed rural Kansas for several years, until he was found by a group of aliens called the "Oort kind", who travel the universe looking for beings like Adam to recruit them to serve as warriors.   Comet returns to Earth to collect Suzie Lane, Lois Lane's niece, who like himself is a Neo-Sapian, which brings him into conflict with Superman, until Suzie uses her powers to drive Comet away. 

When Superman is attacked by the Fifth Dimensional demon Vyndktvx, Comet returns with his fellow Neo-Sapians to assist. They subdue the Kryptonite Men and rescue Krypto while Comet deals with the Phantom King, before helping to banish Vyndktvx back to the Fifth Dimension. 

Comet then appears in Telos #2 as part of a resistance on Colu. Along with Techne (Brainiac's daughter), K'Rot and Stealth, they help Telos and Brainiac take down the ruler of Colu named Computo.

Powers and abilities

Captain Comet is supposedly the pinnacle of human evolution. His mutant mental functions not only give him genius level I.Q. but endow him with a photographic memory and telepathy, enabling him to read or control people's minds (including alien races). He has telekinetic powers, which enable him to use his thoughts to move, lift, and alter matter without physical contact, mentally lift himself to fly at high-speed, create barriers of psychic force to deflect physical attack, and fire bursts of psionic energy that strike with concussive impact, sometimes in the form of lightning or fire blasts. He has an accelerated healing and his telekinetic shield can simultaneously protect him from the vacuum of space and surround him with a breathable environment.

Captain Comet's brain also contains evolved sensory centers enabling him to clairvoyantly "see" events outside of his range of sight. His evolved physiology originally made him superhumanly strong and durable, enough to lift a large spaceship and fight toe to toe with beings such as Lobo. After his resurrection, however, his physical power was significantly diminished, although his mental and psionic abilities have been enhanced.  He has also acquired a teleportation ability that can be used on others as well as himself, but normally requires an hour to recharge after every "jump".

Other versions

Elseworlds
Captain Comet has also appeared in a number of DC Comics titles which do not fit into normal continuity:

 DC Challenge (November 1985 – October 1986)
 Kingdom Come (1996): Captain Comet was a member of Superman's reformed Justice League. He was chosen by Superman to be warden of the Gulag, the holding facility/prison for metahumans who chose to defy the Justice League, and is killed in a prison riot.
 The Golden Age (1991): Captain Comet makes a brief appearance in the final issue, briefly taking part in the battle against Dynaman. This took place in 1951, the first year of his crime fighting career.
 In the DC Tangent "Earth-9" universe, Captain Comet was an African-American superhero from that reality's Chicago who was killed in Czechoslovakia trying to prevent a war in Europe. He was resurrected, and sought revenge for the bombing of a US Army base.
 He also made a brief appearance in the Elseworlds tale JLA: Another Nail (2004), when all time periods melded together.
 An older version of Captain Comet fights against the tyranny of Vril Dox in the Armageddon 2001 crossover. He loses his then-wife, Marijin, in the battle and then is slain himself.

In other media
Captain Comet appears in the Batman: The Brave and the Bold episode "The Siege of Starro!". He is seen with the Green Lantern Corps fighting the Starro-controlled heroes and succumbs to Starro's control.

Adam Blake makes his live-action debut in Naomi, portrayed by Chase Anderson.

Collected editions
 Several stories from the 1950s Strange Adventures series were reprinted in Mysteries in Space: The Best of DC Science Fiction Comics ed. Uslan, Michael (Fireside Books/Simon and Schuster, 1980), 
 The DC Comics Presents story in issue #22 (June 1980) was reprinted in Showcase Presents: DC Comics Presents Superman Team-Ups Vol. 1, (paperback) 512 pages (DC Comics, 2009), 
 The 2006 Mysteries in Space series has been reprinted in two volumes:
 Mystery in Space with Captain Comet: Volume One (paperback), 208 pages (DC Comics, 2007), 
 Mystery in Space with Captain Comet: Volume Two (paperback), 288 pages (DC Comics, 2008), 
 The Rann–Thanagar Holy War series has been reprinted in two volumes.
 The Strange Adventures (vol. 3) series has been reprinted.
 The DC Encyclopaedia – Dougall, Alastair (Dorling Kindersley, 2004, 2008)

Notes

References

External links
 Captain Comet at Don Markstein's Toonopedia. Archived from the original on April 9, 2012.
 Cosmic Teams: Captain Comet
 Captain Comet at DC Comics Database wiki

Characters created by Julius Schwartz
DC Comics male supervillains
DC Comics characters who can move at superhuman speeds
DC Comics characters who can teleport 
DC Comics characters who have mental powers 
DC Comics characters with accelerated healing
DC Comics characters with superhuman strength
DC Comics telekinetics
DC Comics telepaths
DC Comics metahumans 
Fictional characters with eidetic memory
Fictional characters with precognition
Fictional characters with superhuman durability or invulnerability
Fictional characters with slowed ageing
Fictional characters who can turn invisible
Fictional characters with energy-manipulation abilities
Fictional characters with elemental transmutation abilities
Fictional explorers
Comics characters introduced in 1951
Characters created by John Broome
Characters created by Carmine Infantino
Fictional people from the 20th-century